Brett Findlay (born 30 May 1972) is a British film and stage actor.

Findlay trained at the Drama Studio London. He was married to Jemilah Findlay (née Litvinoff, granddaughter of Cherry Marshall and Emanuel Litvinoff) until 2021 when they divorced. They have two children a daughter, Akiko and a Son.

He had a cameo part in Beyond the Fire, the award-winning Best Film (UK Feature) London Independent Film Festival and was principal actor in the 2008 thriller Dark Rage. In his previous career as a musician he is most noted as percussionist with Kula Shaker, the English psychedelic rock band. He also played percussion on Toploader's album Onka's Big Moka.

Filmography
Beyond the Fire Film (2010)
Dark Rage Film (2009)
Remedy Short (2009)
Family Affairs TV (2003)
I Was Never Young Short (2003)

Theatre
The Time of Your Life (2008)
Giving Gorillas Passports (2009)
No Shame, No Fear (2006)
The Pipe Manufacturers Blue Book (2005)
Much Ado About Nothing (2005)
The Constant Wife (2004)
The Country Wife (2004)

Discography
Peasants, Pigs and Astronauts (1999)
Onka's Big Moka (1999)

References

External links
 
Kula Shaker on Later with Jools Holland, 2008
Shift infomercial - Breakdown, 2009
Theatre review for The Time of Your Life, 2008

1972 births
Living people
Alumni of the Drama Studio London
English male film actors
English male stage actors
Male actors from Somerset